Kingman Reef  is a largely submerged, uninhabited, triangle-shaped reef, geologically an atoll,  east-west and  north-south, in the North Pacific Ocean, roughly halfway between the Hawaiian Islands and American Samoa. It has an area of 3 hectares (0.03 km2; 7.4 acres) and is one of the unincorporated territories of the United States in Oceania. The reef is administered by the United States Fish and Wildlife Service as the Kingman Reef National Wildlife Refuge.

History
Kingman Reef was discovered on June 14, 1798, by the American captain Edmund Fanning, of the ship Betsey. It was first described by Captain W. E. Kingman (whose name the island bears) on November 29, 1853. It was claimed in 1860 by the United States Guano Company, under the name "Danger Reef". This claim was made under the United States’ Guano Islands Act of 1856 (although there is no evidence that guano existed or was ever mined on Kingman Reef).

On May 10, 1922, Lorrin A. Thurston became the first person to raise the American flag on the atoll and read a proclamation of annexation. Thurston formally claimed Kingman for the United States by reading this declaration while standing on its shore:
Be it known to all people: That on the tenth of May, A.D. 1922, the undersigned agent of the Island of Palmyra Copra Co., Ltd., landed from the motorship Palmyra doth, on this tenth day of May, A.D. 1922, take formal possession of this island, called Kingman Reef, situated in longitude 162 degrees 18' west and 6 degrees 23' north, on behalf of the United States of America and claim the same for said company.

On December 29, 1934, the U.S. Navy assumed jurisdiction over Kingman Reef. In 1935, the reef was visited by William T. Miller, representing the U.S. Bureau of Air Commerce.

In 1935, Pan American Airways wanted to expand its routes to the Pacific and include Australia and New Zealand in its "Clipper" air routes, with a stopover in Pago Pago, American Samoa. An additional stopover point was sought, however. A supply ship, the North Wind, was stationed at Kingman Reef to provide fuel, lodging, and meals. On March 23, 1937, the S42B Pan American Clipper II, named Samoan Clipper and piloted by Captain Ed Musick, en route from Hawaii to American Samoa, became the first flight to land in Kingman Reef's lagoon.

During the next several months, Pan Am successfully used the lagoon several times as a halfway station for its flying boats (Sikorsky S-42B) when they traveled between those two points. 
However, a Clipper flight on January 11, 1938, ended in tragedy. Shortly after the early-morning takeoff from Pago Pago, as it was bound for New Zealand, the plane exploded. The right outboard engine had developed an oil leak, and the plane burst into flames while dumping fuel; there were no survivors. As a result of the tragedy, Pan Am ended flights to New Zealand via Kingman Reef and Pago Pago. It established a new route in July 1940 that used Canton Island and New Caledonia as stopovers instead.

On February 14, 1941, President Franklin D. Roosevelt issued Executive Order 8682 to create naval defenses areas in the central Pacific territories. The proclamation established "Kingman Reef Naval Defensive Sea Area" which encompassed the territorial waters between the extreme high-water marks and the three-mile marine boundaries surrounding the atoll. "Kingman Naval Airspace Reservation" was also established to restrict access to the airspace over the naval defense sea area. Only U.S. government ships and aircraft were permitted to enter the naval defense areas at Kingman Reef unless authorized by the Secretary of the Navy.

In 2012, Kingman Reef Atoll Development LLC, which was owned by descendants of the owners of the Palmyra Copra Co., Ltd., sued the U.S. government over its designation as a national wildlife refuge. The plaintiff sought $54.5 million in compensation for the loss of fishing rights, ecotourism, and other economic activity. However, in 2014, the federal court ruled that any such claim had expired by 1950 at the latest.

In 2016, the ARRL Awards Committee of the American Radio Relay League removed Kingman Reef from its DXCC list, with the reef now considered part of the Palmyra Island / Jarvis Island DXCC Entity.

Geography 

It has no natural resources and supports no economic activity.

Political status
Kingman Reef has the status of an unincorporated territory of the United States, administered from Washington, D.C., by the U.S. Department of Interior. The atoll is closed to the public. For statistical purposes, Kingman Reef is grouped as part of the United States Minor Outlying Islands. In January 2009, Kingman Reef was designated a marine national monument.

The pre-20th century names Danger Reef, Caldew Reef, Maria Shoal and Crane Shoal refer to this atoll, which at the time was entirely submerged at high tide. Thomas Hale Streets described its state in the 1870s, when it had:
... hardly, as yet, assumed the distinctive features of an island. It is entirely under water at high tide, and but a few coral heads project here and there above the surface at low water. In the course of time, however, it will undoubtedly be added to the [northern Line Islands].

Kingman Reef is considered to be a county-equivalent by the U.S. Census Bureau. With only 0.01 square miles (0.03 square kilometers) of land, Kingman Reef is the smallest county or county-equivalent by land area in the United States.

Ecology

Kingman Reef supports a vast variety of marine life. Giant clams are abundant in the shallows, and there are approximately 38 genera and 130 species of stony corals present on the reef. This is more than three times the species diversity of corals found in the main Hawaiian Islands. The ecosystem of the reef and its subsequent food chain are known for the distinct quality of being primarily predator-based. Sharks comprised 74% of the top predator biomass (329 g·m) at Kingman Reef and 57% at Palmyra Atoll (97 g·m), and low shark numbers have been observed at Tabuaeran and Kiritimati.

The percentage of the total fish biomass on the reef is made up of 85% apex predators, creating a high level of competition for food and nutrients among local organisms – particularly sharks, jacks, and other carnivores. The threatened green sea turtles that frequent nearby Palmyra Atoll travel to Kingman Reef to forage and bask on the coral rubble spits at low tide.

However, above sea level, the reef is usually barren of macroorganisms. Mainly constructed of dead and dried coral skeletons, providing only calcite as a source of nutrients, the small and narrow strips of dry land are only habitable by a handful of species for short periods of time. Most flora which begin to grow above water – primarily coconut palms – die out quickly due to the fierce tides and lack of resources necessary to sustain plant life.

National Wildlife Refuge
On September 1, 2000, the Navy relinquished its control over Kingman Reef to the U.S. Fish and Wildlife Service. On January 18, 2001, Secretary of the Interior Bruce Babbitt created the Kingman Reef National Wildlife Refuge during his final days in office with Secretary's Order 3223. While there are only  of land,  of water area is included in the Refuge. Along with six other islands, the reef was administered as part of the Pacific Remote Islands National Wildlife Refuge Complex. In January 2009, that entity was upgraded to the Pacific Remote Islands Marine National Monument by President George W. Bush.

Amateur radio expeditions
Since the early 1940s, Kingman Reef has had very little human contact, though amateur radio operators from around the world have occasionally visited the reef to put it "on the air" in what is known as a DX-pedition. In 1974, a group of amateurs using the callsign KP6KR sailed to the reef and set up a temporary radio station and antenna. Other groups visited the island in subsequent years, including 1977, 1980, 1981, 1988 and 1993.

More recently, a group of 15 amateur radio operators from the Palmyra DX Group visited the reef in October 2000. Using the FCC-issued special event callsign K5K, the group made more than 80,000 individual contacts with amateurs around the world over a period of 10 days.

Between November 15, 1945, and March 28, 2016, Kingman Reef was considered a discrete entity for the purpose of earning awards such as the DX Century Club. A video shot by amateur radio operators traveling to the K5P DX-pedition on Palmyra in January 2016 appears to show Kingman Reef mostly awash, raising questions as to whether a future activation of Kingman Reef would be possible.

On March 28, 2016, the ARRL DXCC desk deleted Kingman Reef from the list of collectable entities effective March 29, 2016, and deeming Kingman a part of the Palmyra and Jarvis entity due to proximity of the islands and common administration of the islands by the Fish and Wildlife Service.

See also
 Dependent territory
 Insular area
 List of Guano Island claims

References

External links

 Kingman Reef history by Jane Resture
 Kingman Reef National Wildlife Refuge
 K5K Amateur Radio Expedition to Kingman Reef
 Kennedy Warne: "An Uneasy Eden" — National Geographic Magazine, July 2008

Pacific islands claimed under the Guano Islands Act
Pacific Remote Islands Marine National Monument
Coral reefs of the United States
Line Islands
Reefs of the Pacific Ocean
Uninhabited Pacific islands of the United States
United States Minor Outlying Islands
National Wildlife Refuges in the United States insular areas
Protected areas established in 2001
Reefs of the United States